Chautauqua Auditorium may refer to

 Chautauqua Auditorium (Boulder, Colorado)
 Chautauqua Auditorium (Shelbyville, Illinois)
 Chautauqua Auditorium (Waxahachie, Texas)